Noni White is an American writer and actress. White is best known for co-creating and writing the screenplay for Newsies along with her husband Bob Tzudiker, which was based on the real-life Newsboys' strike of 1899. Newsies began as a "classic underdog story ripped from the history books", with writers Tzudiker and White approaching producer Michael Finnell with an idea for a nonmusical drama; however, Disney studio head Jeffrey Katzenberg redirected the project to become a musical.

She also shares writing credit on The Hunchback of Notre Dame ( 1996), Anastasia (1997), Tarzan (1999), and 102 Dalmatians (2000). She also contributed to the film The Lion King (1994) and has written screenplays for every major studio.

The stage version of Newsies opened March 29, 2012, and closed on August 24, 2014, grossing over $100 million. The 2017 three-day cinema showing of Disney's Newsies: The Broadway Musical! broke ticketing records to become the highest-grossing Broadway event to date from Fathom Events.

She is a member of the writers' branch of the Academy of Motion Picture Arts and Sciences. She received several nominations for the Annie Award for Writing in a Feature Production.

Noni also works as an actress, and has appeared in The Prize Winner of Defiance, Ohio, 7th Heaven and The Positively True Adventures of the Alleged Texas Cheerleader-Murdering Mom, among many others.

Awards and nominations

References

Living people
American women screenwriters
Animation screenwriters
20th-century American women writers
Walt Disney Animation Studios people
Year of birth missing (living people)